List of works by or about Peter Hessler, American journalist.

Books

Essays and reporting 
 
 
 
 
 
  Abstract
 

 
 
 
 
 
 
—  (April 1, 2019) "The Refugee and the Thief, A Gay Egyptian leaves his Homeland." The New Yorker.

Notes

Bibliographies by writer
Bibliographies of American writers